Newark City School District is a public school district in the city of Newark, Ohio.  The district is the largest in Licking County, with nearly 6,500 students.

District history
The district was formed in 1848 after the passage of a voter petition to unify the schools in Newark under one system.  The first school board was elected on September 19, 1849.  A "Negro school" operated from 1859 until 1888 to provide segregated education to African American children in the Newark district.

At the request of the U.S. government in 1940, the district initiated industrial training programs that were intended to assist in national defense.  The shops operated 24 hours a day, six days a week, and after the attack on Pearl Harbor, became directly funded by the government to expand into a second building and thirty-five classes.  It has been estimated that the district trained 8,000 people between 1940 and 1945 with skills essential to the national defense industries.

, three additional elementary schools and two middle schools are slated to begin construction.

In mid-2005 Newark City Schools began to phase out its former system of schooling. Under the former system, grades K-4th went to elementary school, grades 5th-6th went to intermediate school, 7th-8th went to middle school, and grades 9th-12th went to High School. Under the reformed system of schooling, grades K-5 go to elementary school, 6-8 goes to middle school, and 9-12 goes to high school. Former intermediate schools include Central Intermediate and West Main Intermediate. Central is now a private school and West Main is a vacant facility.

The elementary schools are Carson, Cherry Valley, Hillview, and Legend Elementary Schools. The middle schools are Heritage (replaced Lincoln), Liberty Middle School (replaced Roosevelt) and Wilson Middle School.

District management
The district's Board of Education consists of five citizens elected to staggered four-year terms, with one president, one vice-president, and three members.  In addition to the general goal of educating the district's students, the Board has the specific duties of hiring the district's superintendent and treasurer, overseeing the annual budget, and approving contracts with district employees.  Board meetings are open to the public and held in the high school library.

The superintendent is directly responsible to the district Board of Education, and implements board policies.  S/he administers the district's educational programs and has final responsibility for curriculum, staffing, and evaluation.  All district employees are responsible to the superintendent, except for the treasurer, who is also a direct employee of the board.  In cooperation with the superintendent, the treasurer manages the district's financial, legal and contractual affairs.

Board of education
President - Pastor Timothy Carr
Vice President - Thomas Bline
Member - Warren Weber (MSgt USAF-Retired)
Member - Mark Christenberry 
Member - Michael Blowers

District Administration
Superintendent of Schools- David Lewis (since 2020)
Assistant Superintendent for Curriculum & Staff Development- Maura Horgan
Assistant Superintendent for Certificated & Licensed Personnel- Barbara Quackenbush 
District Treasurer/CFO - Julio Valladares 
Assistant District Treasurer - Trent Montgomery
Athletic Director- Jeffery Quackenbush
Communications Coordinator- Seth Roy
Director of Classified Support Services- Mark Shively 
Assistant Director of Curriculum for State and Federal Programs- Tara Boyer  
Director of Transportation- Kip Slater
Director of Student Services- Melinda Vaughn  
Special Education Coordinator- Jennifer McMahon (Preschool-5)
Special Education Coordinator- Nicole Garrison (6-12)
Special Education Coordinator- Mark Severance
Gifted Coordinator- Cathy Allen
Special Projects Coordinator- Gemma Zimmerman
Food Service Operations Supervisor- Todd Gallup 
District Technology Supervisor- Amy Norman
Assistant Supervisor for Buildings, Grounds, and Transportation- Allen Fordham
District Nurse- Olivia Haas, RN (Preschool-5)
District Nurse- Heather Kee, RN (6-12)
District Wellness Coordinator- Ronni Bowyer
District Parent Mentor- Brittany Collins

Schools

Newark Digital Academy
Grades K-12.  An online, state-accredited distance learning program.
Principal- Angie Adkins
Dean of Students- Matt Phillips
School Social Worker- Brandi Moffitt

Newark High School
Grades 9–12.  Average enrollment is approximately 1200 students; an additional 150 students attend the Career Technical Education Center (C-TEC) associated with the school.  The staff is around 190.  The high school was originally built in 1887 as a series of buildings, before being partially rebuilt in 1959 (re-opened in 1961), and later undergoing massive renovations, additions, connections between the separate buildings, and major demolition in the early 2010s.  Newark plays division I athletics in the Central Ohio Division of the Ohio Capital Conference. Major athletics rivalries are with Lancaster High School and Zanesville High School.

Building Administration
Principal- Thomas Bowman 
Assistant Principal- Whitney Bobo
Assistant Principal- Matthew Hazelton 
Assistant Principal- JR Shumate

Guidance & Counseling 
School Counselor- Molly Stayer
School Counselor- Luke Johnston
School Counselor- Michelle Lott
School Counselor- Scott Koebel

Department of Fine Arts
Director of Orchestras- Ashley Rudd 
Director of Bands- Lee Auer  
Director of Theatre- P. David Williams 
Director of Choirs- Russell Nutt

A Call to College
A Call to College is a non-profit organization founded in 1988 by Jane Cook McConnell and Lou Mitchell to work with Newark City Schools to help promote college access for students in Newark, Ohio.

Administration
Executive Director - Tara Houdeshell 
Associate Director for Programming - Shannon Chiacchira 
Director of Early Awareness- Janet Shultz
Director of College Preparation & Success- Jennifer Anthony 
Director of College Preparation & Success - Brett Underhill

Middle schools
Grades 6-9
.  Wilson (built in the early 1920s) is the oldest of the three Middle schools. Liberty is the newest, opening in 2007. Two former Middle schools of Newark include Roosevelt Middle School (now the Administrative Service Building, which is used for important events, such as the Student of the Month Luncheon, as well as the monthly (and special) School Board meetings) and Lincoln Middle School. Both were built in the late 1800s.
Heritage Middle School (formerly Lincoln Middle School)
Principal- Kyle Walters
Dean of Students- Doug Duesenberry 
Linkage Coordinator- Dava Pinney
Student Advocate- Ashley Savage
Liberty Middle School (formerly Roosevelt Middle School)
Principal- Brent Fickes
Dean of Students- Adam Rose
Linkage Coordinator- James McMillian
Wilson Middle School (formerly Wilson Middle School) 
Principal- John Davis
Dean of Students- Brett Montgomery
Linkage Coordinator- Rahlin Watson 
Student Advocate- Richard Nabors

Former middle schools
Lincoln Middle School (Originally Abraham Lincoln Junior High School)
Roosevelt Middle School (Originally Franklin D. Roosevelt Junior High School, now used as the Administrative Service Building)
Central Junior High School (Renamed John F. Kennedy Junior High School briefly, name reverted to Central School when it was converted to use as an Intermediate school).
Benjamin Franklin Junior High School (Now Benjamin Franklin Elementary School)

Former intermediate schools
Central Intermediate School (now a privately owned school)
West Main Intermediate School (now the temporary home of McGuffey Elementary School)
Kettering Intermediate School (Was changed to Elementary school until it was demolished)

Elementary schools
Grades PK-5

Ben Franklin Elementary School 
Principal- Dena Cable-Miller
Dean of Students- Lynda Nabors
Carson Elementary School
Principal- Julie Elwell
Dean of Students- Matt Phillips
Cherry Valley Elementary School
Principal- Chet Coleman 
Dean of Students- Maggie Abbott
Hillview Elementary School
Principal- Nick Myers
Dean of Students- Maggie Abbott
Johnny Clem Elementary School
Principal- Andrea McVey
Dean of Students- Ann Smith
Legend Elementary School
Principal- Laura Sluss
Dean of Students- Lynda Nabors
William H. McGuffey Elementary School
Principal- Cynthia M. Baker
Dean of Students- Ann Smith

Former elementary schools
Riverside School (Demolished in the 1950s)
Mound Elementary School (Now an architecture firm)
South Fifth Street School
South Third Street School
William E. Miller Elementary School (Now a branch of Mount Vernon Nazarene University)
North Elementary School (Demolished in late 2009)
Conrad Elementary School
East Main Street School
Maholm Elementary School (Now a private school)
Hartzler School
Kettering Elementary School (Demolished, originally Kettering Intermediate School)
Hazelwood Elementary School (Now a Church Ministry)
Helen Keller Elementary School (Now Licking County Alcohol Prevention Program-LAPP)
Woodside Elementary School (Now Newark Digital Academy)
North Fourth Street School

See also
 WGSF (TV)—defunct television station owned by the school district; lives on today as a cable channel
 List of school districts in Ohio

References

http://www.newarkcity.k12.oh.us/schoolsList.aspx

External links
 Newark City School District official site

Newark, Ohio
School districts in Ohio
Education in Licking County, Ohio
School districts established in 1848